Ernest J.  Watson (December 13, 1895 – March 10, 1995) was an American football player and coach.

Head coaching record

References

External links
 
 

1895 births
1995 deaths
Olivet Comets football coaches
Olivet Comets football players
Detroit Heralds players
People from Pontiac, Michigan
Coaches of American football from Michigan
Players of American football from Michigan